Vítězslav Országh (born 21 December 1943) is a Czech weightlifter. He competed in the men's middle heavyweight event at the 1968 Summer Olympics.

References

External links
 

1943 births
Living people
Czech male weightlifters
Olympic weightlifters of Czechoslovakia
Weightlifters at the 1968 Summer Olympics
People from Vsetín District
Sportspeople from the Zlín Region